Antonina Lazareva (née , Okorokova; born March 27, 1941, in Serpukhov) is a Soviet high jumper.

She won the silver medal at the 1968 Summer Olympics held in Mexico City, Mexico. She won the bronze medal at the European Indoor Games in 1968 and 1969.

References

1941 births
Living people
Russian female high jumpers
Soviet female high jumpers
People from Serpukhov
Olympic silver medalists for the Soviet Union
Athletes (track and field) at the 1968 Summer Olympics
Athletes (track and field) at the 1972 Summer Olympics
Olympic athletes of the Soviet Union
Medalists at the 1968 Summer Olympics
Olympic silver medalists in athletics (track and field)
Sportspeople from Moscow Oblast